Wacton is a village in the English county of Norfolk.

One of Wacton's most prominent features is All Saints round tower church.

History
The villages name means 'Waca's farm/settlement'.

In John Marius Wilson's Imperial Gazetteer of England and Wales 1870–72, Wacton, Norfolk (which at the time was two parishes) was described as: "WACTON-MAGNA and W.-Parva, two parishes in Depwade district, Norfolk; 1 mile ESE of Forcett r. station, and 1½ SW of Long Stratton-Post town, Long Stratton. Acres, 1,044. Real property, £1,981. Pop., 244. Houses, 54. The property is much subdivided. The livings are conjoint rectories in the diocese of Norwich. Value, £302. Patron, the Rev.Grain. The church was recently restored."

As you can see in the above graph, there was a far narrower range of occupations for Wacton's residents in 1881 in comparison to 2011. The vast majority of working Males in village worked in 'Agriculture' (37), the other occupations had a very low number of men occupied the next most frequent occupations were 'House, Furniture & Decoration' (3) and 'Professionals' (also 3).

A large percentage of the females had 'No Specified Occupation' (37) whilst a further 19 had an 'Unknown' occupation. After these two categories, the next most frequent occupation was work in 'Domestic Services & Offices'

Despite Wacton's relative insignificance being amongst hundreds of small villages in the country, it actually has history dating back to thousands of years. The earliest known presence of people in the parish is known to be as far back as prehistoric times. Evidence was discovered during fieldwalks in 1978–80 when boiling pots and flints were found amongst other records from other historic periods. There was little records of the preceding Bronze and Iron Ages been significant in the parish, the only records being flint tools in the early part of the Bronze Age and socketed spearheads in the latter half. For the Iron Age the only records found were silver coins and pottery sherds.

There was a strong Roman period presence in Wacton too. A major road called Pye Road used to run through the village from Scole and a Roman town named Venta Icenorum at Caistor St Edmund. The finest artefacts discovered from the Roman include gold coin which was discovered in a garden in Wash Lane in 1998. Evidence suggests Barbarous radiate coins were likely manufactured in the south side of Wacton too.

There is a gap in history in Wacton with there being very few and far between finds from the Saxon period. However, the following Medieval period was the richest historical period for Wacton. It was the period in which the still standing All Saints Church was erected along with St. Mary's Church which no longer stands. St Mary's church later became a chapel in 1500 but was followed by a period of disuse between 1510 and 1522 before being used as a dovecote. Other less significant artefacts from the Medieval period include a cowbell found in 1979, a coin weight and a silver strap fittling.

In more recent history, The Eastern Union Railway used to run through Wacton to London from the mid 19th century to its closure in 1966. There was not a station in Wacton, but villagers could catch the train at the nearby Forncett.

All Saints Church 
The round-tower church is Wacton's most prominent and recognisable landmark. The structure has two main segments, the tower and main body. The lower stage of the tower may be Saxon. The church is thought to have been built in the 12th century, with alterations made in the following centuries such as door and window replacement

All Saints Church, along with numerous other buildings in Wacton, has protected status

Wacton Village Hall 

Wacton Village Hall is a relatively new feature to Wacton. The Hall only fully opened to the village's residents in 2013 after many years of fundraising and a six-year building programme. The facilities are open for community events as well as public and private hire. The running of the Hall requires volunteers wherever possible.

Before the current village hall there was another, built in the 1950s. However, by the 1990s it was severely worn out and required a replacement – hence the new one. Users of the previous hall mused that one would have to wear woolly hats and gloves in doors as well as bring an umbrella such was the state of the halls waterworks and heating. It was finally announced in 1997 that a new planning application had been sent for a new building. However, it actually took a further 16 years for the hall to be fully open for use for everyone. It was built after £200,000 was eventually raised by local residents.

Facilities:

The main hall – relatively large, 15m x 5.5m, holding a capacity of 120 standing, 80 seated. There is also a meeting room, 7m x 3.5m with a capacity of 40 standing 30 seated. The Hall also boasts a kitchen, foyer, toilets and full wheelchair access.

Regular users: Computer Club, Wacton Coffee Morning, Pilates, Fitsteps, Wacton Parish Council meetings, Wacton Village Hall meetings

Demographics 

The above graph shows the total population of Wacton in the years from 1801–2011. There has been growth in between 1801 and 2011, however it has been quite conservative with the initial population being 241, with the population being 302 as of 2011. However the vast majority of this growth has been between 1961 and 2001 where the population grew from 172 to 319. Before 1961, despite occasional peaks in growth, the population was in gradual decline. Since 2001 the population has shrunk very slightly to 302 (2001), however its to early to say whether this is going to be a trend for decades to come, or whether it is simply another trough before a peak in growth.

The current population of Wacton is a relatively old one – 59.3% of Wacton's residents are over 45 years of age. The largest age bracket grouping is 45–59 which account for 28.1% of Wacton's total population. The percentage of Wacton's residents under 18 is just 17.9%

The ethnic make-up of Wacton is overwhelmingly white British, 94.4% of Wacton's population is in this group. The remaining 5.6% is various other ethnic groups, the only ethnic group other than white British with more than 2 residents in Wacton is the white/Asian mixed group which has 5

The socio-economic classification of much of Wacton's residents could be considered middle-class. This is light of the fact that the most common occupations for Wacton's residents are "Professional Occupations" (31 residents) and "Associate Professional and Technical Occupations" (26). Other notable careers Wacton residents have are "Skilled Trade Occupations" (24), "Administrative and Secretarial Occupations" (19) and "Managers, Directors and Senior Official Occupations" (18)

References

External links 
 All Saints on the European Round Tower Churches website

Villages in Norfolk
South Norfolk